Roser Bastida Areny  (born 28 September 1955) is an Andorran politician. She is a member of the Liberal Party of Andorra.

References

Members of the General Council (Andorra)
1955 births
Living people
Andorran women in politics
Liberal Party of Andorra politicians
21st-century women politicians